Andile Simelane (born 3 June 2003) is a South African cricketer. He made his List A debut on 26 January 2020, for North West in the 2019–20 CSA Provincial One-Day Challenge. He made his Twenty20 debut on 8 October 2021, for the South Africa Under-19s in the 2021–22 CSA Provincial T20 Knock-Out tournament. In November 2021, he was named in South Africa's team for the 2022 ICC Under-19 Cricket World Cup in the West Indies. On 19 February 2023, he made his First class debut for Dolphins in the 2022–23 CSA 4-Day Series tournament.

References

External links
 

2003 births
Living people
South African cricketers
North West cricketers
Place of birth missing (living people)